The 1937 Dartmouth Indians football team represented Dartmouth College in the 1937 college football season. The Indians were led by fourth-year head coach Earl Blaik and played their home games at Memorial Field in Hanover, New Hampshire. The Indians finished undefeated with a record of 7–0–2, finishing No. 7 in the final AP Poll, their highest ever finish. Dartmouth was invited to play in the 1938 Rose Bowl, but declined the invitation.

Schedule

References

Dartmouth
Dartmouth Big Green football seasons
Dartmouth Indians football